Lore Harp McGovern is an entrepreneur and philanthropist based in Northern California.  She was born in Poland under German occupation, moved to the United States and married Patrick J. McGovern, with whom she co-founded the McGovern Institute for Brain Research at MIT in 2000.  She has founded or run companies in diverse fields including health care, educational publishing and high-tech, and is an investor in numerous start-up companies in Silicon Valley. She was a co-founder of Vector Graphic, one of the earliest PC companies, and was president and CEO of the educational publishing company Good Morning Teacher! She was named Entrepreneur of the Year in 1983 by Women Business Owners of New York and has been awarded the Distinguished Immigrant Award by the Commonwealth Club of San Francisco. She is also Chair Emerita of the Board of Associates of the Whitehead Institute for Biomedical Research.

External links 
 Biography on McGovern Institute Web Site
 Small Biography of Lore's co-founding of Vector Graphics
 MIT announcement of the McGovern Institute

American philanthropists
Businesspeople from the San Francisco Bay Area
Philanthropists from California
Living people
Year of birth missing (living people)